The Hershey Trust Company is an American corporation incorporated on April 28, 1905, by Milton S. Hershey, Harry Lebkicher and John E. Snyder. The company is a minority owner of The Hershey Company and sole private owner of Hershey Entertainment and Resorts Company and administrator of the 2,000 student Milton Hershey School. It manages the $13.751 billion USD (2015) endowment of the Milton Hershey School and School Trust.

History
On April 28, 1905, the Pennsylvania Department of State issued a charter creating the Hershey Trust Company. In 1909, when Hershey founded the Milton Hershey School, Hershey appointed the Trust as administrator of the school trust.

2011 investigation of the Hershey Trust Company
In February 2011, Robert Reese (grandson of H. B. Reese the inventor of Reese's Peanut Butter Cups), a former board member and president of the Trust, filed a lawsuit against the Hershey Trust Company alleging that Trust had been improperly using the Trust's money. One particular issue was the purchase of the Wren Dale Golf Course, in which the Hershey Trust overpaid for the property, to the benefit of board members who were both owners of the Wren Dale Golf Course and on the Hershey Trust board. Reese withdrew the lawsuit in April 2011, due to deteriorating health. Reese suggested the Pennsylvania Attorney General had enough cause to investigate the Hershey Trust.

In 2013, Kathleen Kane, the Pennsylvania Attorney General, announced the conclusion of a two-year investigation into the operations of the Hershey Trust Company, in which the Office of Attorney General and the Hershey Trust Company agreed that there was a finding of no wrongdoing, but reforms were required of the trust company.

2016 developments
In May 2016, the state attorney general asked the company to remove three members from the ten-person board. The attorney general said that the three had allowed "apparent violations" of the 2013 agreement. At about the same time, in an unrelated investigation, John Estey, former chief of staff to Governor Ed Rendell and a high-ranking executive of the company, was charged with wire fraud, having pocketed $13,000 that an FBI sting operation had given to him in an investigation into illegal lobbying of legislators.

Entities of the Milton Hershey School Trust
The Hershey Company
Hershey Entertainment and Resorts Company
Milton Hershey School

Entities of the Milton S. Hershey Foundation
 Hershey Cemetery
 Hershey Community Archives
 Hershey Gardens
 The Hershey Story (museum)
 Hershey Theatre
 Penn State Milton S. Hershey Medical Center 

Notes

References

External links
 

 

Hershey Trust Company
1905 establishments in Pennsylvania
Companies based in Dauphin County, Pennsylvania
Conglomerate companies established in 1905
Hershey, Pennsylvania